Hwang Jin-San (Hangul: 황진산; born February 25, 1989) is a South Korean football player for Hwaseong FC in K3 League.

External links
 

1989 births
Living people
Association football defenders
South Korean footballers
Ulsan Hyundai FC players
Daejeon Hana Citizen FC players
Bucheon FC 1995 players
K League 1 players
K League 2 players
K3 League players
Korea National League players
Yonsei University alumni
Association football midfielders
People from Jinju
Sportspeople from South Gyeongsang Province